Passiflora kermesina ('kermesina'=crimson) (syn. Passiflora raddiana DC.) is a native plant of Brazil, which is found in the wild in Caatinga and Cerrado vegetation.

It is cultivated as a vining ornamental plant.

References

External links
The Floral Cabinet & Magazine of Exotic Botany 1837-1840: Passiflora kermesina

kermesina
Flora of Brazil
Flora of the Cerrado
Garden plants of South America
Vines